Rustem Hoxha (born 29 July 1991) is an Albanian professional footballer who plays as a centre-back for Kosovar club Ballkani.

Club career

Teuta Durrës
Hoxha made his league debut for the senior team on 14 May 2010 by playing full-90 minutes in a 3–1 home victory over Flamurtari Vlorë. His first score-sheet contributions came similarly to his time with Luftëtari Gjirokastër, netting the equalizer in the 44th minute of the 1–1 draw versus Tirana on 13 March 2014. On 2 June 2017, Hoxha left the club after nine years, where he collected more than 150 appearances in all competitions.

Loan to Luftëtari Gjirokastër
In January 2013, Hoxha was loaned out to Albanian Superliga club Luftëtari Gjirokastër. He made his first appearance for the team on 10 February in a 3–1 home loss to Kukësi. His first goal came on 2 March 2013 in the league match against Tirana, netting the temporary equalizer in an eventual 2–1 loss at Qemal Stafa Stadium.

Kukësi
On 19 June 2017, Hoxha agreed personal terms and joined fellow top flight side Kukësi. He was presented a day later where he signed the contract and was given squad number 5.

Hoxha played his first match with his new side on 9 September 2017 in the opening week of 2017–18 Albanian Superliga against Kamza, contributing in the 1–0 win. His maiden goal for the team came later on 19 February of the following year in the 3–1 away win over Partizani Tirana.

He left the club in mid-August 2018 after deciding to end his cooperation following the elimination of Kukësi from Europa League, finishing his spell with 42 appearances and 2 goals.

Luftëtari Gjirokastër
On 6 September 2018, Hoxha returned to Luftëtari Gjirokastër this time as a permanent transfer, signing for the 2018–19 season.

International career
Hoxha is a former Albanian youth international and has represented his nation at under-17 and under-21 levels.

Career statistics

References

External links
FSHF profile

1991 births
Living people
Footballers from Durrës
Albanian footballers
Association football central defenders
Albania under-21 international footballers
Albania youth international footballers
KF Teuta Durrës players
Luftëtari Gjirokastër players
FK Kukësi players
Kategoria Superiore players